Pasiphila chloerata, the sloe pug, is a moth in the family Geometridae. It is found from Europe to the Amur Region and central Asia.

Adults are on wing from May to June. There is one generation per year.

The larvae feed on Amelanchier and Prunus species (including Prunus padus, Prunus virginiana and Prunus spinosa). Larvae can be found from April to May. It overwinters as an egg.

Subspecies
Pasiphila chloerata chloerata
Pasiphila chloerata bowringi (Prout, 1958)

References

External links

Fauna Europaea
Lepiforum e.V.
UKMoths
De Vlinderstichting 

Moths described in 1870
chloerata
Moths of Japan
Moths of Europe
Moths of Asia
Taxa named by Paul Mabille